Charlie Wilson's War is a 2007 American biographical comedy-drama film, based on the story of U.S. Congressman Charlie Wilson and CIA operative Gust Avrakotos, whose efforts led to Operation Cyclone, a program to organize and support the Afghan mujahideen during the Soviet–Afghan War (1979–1989).

The film was directed by Mike Nichols (his final film) and written by Aaron Sorkin, who adapted George Crile III's 2003 book Charlie Wilson's War: The Extraordinary Story of the Largest Covert Operation in History. Tom Hanks, Julia Roberts, and Philip Seymour Hoffman starred, with Amy Adams and Ned Beatty in supporting roles. It was nominated for five Golden Globe Awards, including Best Motion Picture – Musical or Comedy, but did not win in any category. Hoffman was nominated for an Academy Award for Best Supporting Actor.

Plot summary

In 1980, Congressman Charlie Wilson is more interested in partying than legislating, frequently throwing huge galas and staffing his congressional office with attractive young women. His social life eventually brings about a federal investigation into allegations of his cocaine use, conducted by federal prosecutor Rudy Giuliani as part of a larger investigation into congressional misconduct. The investigation results in no charge against Wilson.

A friend and romantic interest, Joanne Herring, encourages Charlie to do more to help the Afghan people, and persuades him to visit the Pakistani leadership. The Pakistanis complain about the inadequate support of the U.S. to oppose the Soviet Union, and they insist that Wilson visit a major Pakistan-based Afghan refugee camp. The Congressman is deeply moved by their misery and determination to fight, but is frustrated by the regional CIA personnel's insistence on a low key approach against the Soviet occupation of Afghanistan. Wilson returns home to lead an effort to substantially increase funding to the mujahideen.

As part of this effort, Charlie befriends maverick CIA operative Gust Avrakotos and his understaffed Afghanistan group to find a better strategy, especially including a means to counter the Soviets' formidable Mil Mi-24 Hind helicopter gunship. This group was composed in part of members of the CIA's Special Activities Division, including a young paramilitary officer named Michael Vickers. As a result, Charlie's deft political bargaining for the necessary funding and Avrakotos' careful planning using those resources, such as supplying the guerrillas with FIM-92 Stinger missile launchers, turns the Soviet occupation into a deadly quagmire with their heavy fighting vehicles being destroyed at a crippling rate. Charlie enlists the support of Israel and Egypt for Soviet weapons and consumables, and Pakistan for distribution of arms.  The CIA's anti-communism budget evolves from $5 million to over $500 million (with the same amount matched by Saudi Arabia), startling several congressmen. This effort by Charlie ultimately evolves into a major portion of the U.S. foreign policy known as the Reagan Doctrine, under which the U.S. expanded assistance beyond just the mujahideen and began also supporting other anti-communist resistance movements around the world. Charlie states that senior Pentagon official Michael Pillsbury persuaded President Ronald Reagan to provide the Stingers to the Afghans.

Gust vehemently advises Charlie to seek support for post-Soviet occupation Afghanistan, referencing the "zen master's" story of the lost horse. He also emphasizes that rehabilitating schools in the country will help educate young children before they are influenced by the "crazies". Charlie attempts to appeal this with the government but finds no enthusiasm for even the modest measures he proposes. In the end, Charlie receives a major commendation for his support of the U.S. clandestine services, but his pride is tempered by his fears of the blowback his secret efforts could yield in the future and the implications of U.S. disengagement from Afghanistan.

Cast

 Tom Hanks as Representative Charlie Wilson
 Julia Roberts as Joanne Herring
 Philip Seymour Hoffman as Gust Avrakotos
 Amy Adams as Bonnie Bach
 Ned Beatty as Representative Doc Long
 Christopher Denham as Michael G. Vickers
 Emily Blunt as Jane Liddle
 Om Puri as President of Pakistan Zia-ul-Haq
 Faran Tahir as Brigadier Rashid
 Ken Stott as Israeli arms merchant Zvi Rafiah
 John Slattery as CIA director of European operations Henry Cravely
 Michael Spellman as CIA Agent Patrick
 Denis O'Hare as CIA station chief Harold Holt
 Jud Tylor as the aspiring starlet Crystal Lee
 Peter Gerety as Larry Liddle
 Brian Markinson as Crystal Lee's agent, Paul Brown
 Spencer Garrett as congressional committee staffer
 Kevin Cooney as congressional committee staffer
 Aharon Ipalé as the Egyptian Defense Minister
 Pasha Lychnikoff as Russian helicopter pilot
 Cyia Batten as Stacey
 Tracy Phillips as Carol Shannon, bellydancer
 Navid Negahban as refugee camp translator
 Shiri Appleby as Jailbait
 Rachel Nichols as Suzanne
 Wynn Everett as receptionist
 Shaun Toub as Hassan (uncredited)

Release and reception

Box office
The film was originally set for release on December 25, 2007; but on November 30, the timetable was moved back to December 21. In its opening weekend, the film grossed $9.6 million in 2,575 theaters in the United States and Canada, ranking No. 4 at the box office. It grossed a total of $119 million worldwide—$66.7 million in the United States and Canada and $52.3 million in other territories.

Critical reaction
On review aggregator Rotten Tomatoes, the film has an approval rating of 82% based on 204 reviews, with an average rating of 7.00/10. The site's critical consensus reads, "Charlie Wilson's War manages to entertain and inform audiences, thanks to its witty script and talented cast of power players." Metacritic reported the film had an average score of 69 out of 100, based on 39 critics, indicating "generally favorable reviews". Audiences polled by CinemaScore gave the film an average grade of "A−" on an A+ to F scale.

Governmental criticism and praise
Some Reagan Era officials, including former Under Secretary of Defense Fred Ikle, have criticized some elements of the film. The Washington Times reported claims that the film wrongly promotes the notion that the CIA-led operation funded Osama bin Laden and ultimately produced the September 11 attacks; however, other Reagan-era officials have been more supportive of the film.  Michael Johns, the former foreign policy analyst at The Heritage Foundation and White House speechwriter to President George H. W. Bush, praised the film as "the first mass-appeal effort to reflect the most important lesson of America's Cold War victory: that the Reagan-led effort to support freedom fighters resisting Soviet oppression led successfully to the first major military defeat of the Soviet Union... Sending the Red Army packing from Afghanistan proved one of the single most important contributing factors in one of history's most profoundly positive and important developments."

Russian reception
In February 2008, it was revealed that the film would not release in Russian theaters. The rights for the film were bought by Universal Pictures International (UPI) Russia. It was speculated that the film would not appear because of a certain point of view that depicted the Soviet Union unfavorably. UPI Russia head Yevgeny Beginin denied that, saying, "We simply decided that the film would not make a profit." Reaction from Russian bloggers was also negative. One wrote: "The whole film shows Russians, or rather Soviets, as brutal killers."

Historicity

Mujahideen support
While the film depicts Wilson as an immediate advocate for supplying the mujahideen with Stinger missiles, a former Reagan administration official recalls that he and Wilson, while advocates for the mujahideen, were actually initially "lukewarm" on the idea of supplying these missiles. Their opinion changed when they discovered that rebels were successful in downing Soviet gunships with them. As such, they were actually not supplied until 1987, during the second Reagan term, and their provision was advocated mostly by Reagan defense officials and influential conservatives.

Happy ending
According to Melissa Roddy, a Los Angeles film maker with inside information from the production, the film's happy ending where Wilson is awarded came about because Tom Hanks did not feel comfortable with an original draft which ended on a scene featuring the September 11 attacks.  Citing the original screenplay, which was very different from the final product, in Reel Power: Hollywood Cinema and American Supremacy Matthew Alford wrote that the film gave up "the chance to produce what at least had the potential to be the Dr. Strangelove of our generation".

Academic Research
The book and the film based on it are mostly rated negatively in terms of historical accuracy.

Aftermath
The film depicts the concern expressed by Charlie and Gust that Afghanistan was being neglected in the 1990s, following the Soviet withdrawal. In one of the film's final scenes, Gust dampens Charlie's enthusiasm over the Soviet withdrawal from Afghanistan, saying "I'm about to give you an NIE (National Intelligence Estimate) that shows the crazies are rolling into Kandahar."  As he says this, the sound of jet airliners soar overhead, a premonition of the coming 9/11 attacks.

George Crile III, author of the book on which the film is based, wrote that the mujahideen's victory in Afghanistan ultimately opened a power vacuum for bin Laden: 

In 2008, Canadian journalist Arthur Kent sued the makers of the film, claiming that they had used material he produced in the 1980s without obtaining the proper authorization. On September 19, 2008, Kent announced that he had reached a settlement with the film's producers and distributors, and that he was "very pleased" with the terms of the settlement, which remain confidential.

Awards and nominations

Home media
The film was released on DVD April 22, 2008, while a HD DVD/DVD combo was also made available

References

External links

 
 
 
 
 

2007 films
2000s English-language films
2007 biographical drama films
2000s spy films
American biographical drama films
American political drama films
American spy films
American docudrama films
Films about American politicians
American films based on actual events
Spy films based on actual events
Films about the Central Intelligence Agency
Films based on non-fiction books
Films directed by Mike Nichols
Films set in the Las Vegas Valley
Films set in Afghanistan
Films set in Pakistan
Films set in the 1980s
Films set in Washington, D.C.
Playtone films
Relativity Media films
Soviet–Afghan War films
Universal Pictures films
Insurgency in Khyber Pakhtunkhwa fiction
Films scored by James Newton Howard
Participant (company) films
Films produced by Tom Hanks
Films produced by Gary Goetzman
Films with screenplays by Aaron Sorkin
2007 drama films
2000s American films